Anneli Maria Hulthén (born 27 July 1960) is a Swedish politician who has been the Governor of Skåne since August 2016.  She was a Member of the Swedish parliament (the Riksdag) from 1986 until 1996, and a Member of the European Parliament from 1995 until 2002.

A member of the  Social Democrats, she served as chairman (mayor) of the Gothenburg Municipality executive board from 2009 to 2016.

Hultén won the Politician Award at the 2011 World Entrepreneurship Forum in Singapore, for her work with Business Region Göteborg and their programmes "Expedition Forward", "Business Emergency Programme" and "Brew House Incubator".

References

|-

|-

|-

|-

|-

1960 births
Living people
People from Gothenburg
Municipal commissioners of Sweden
Members of the Riksdag
Swedish people of Finnish descent
Swedish Social Democratic Party MEPs
MEPs for Sweden 1995–1999
MEPs for Sweden 1999–2004
20th-century women MEPs for Sweden
21st-century women MEPs for Sweden
Women members of the Riksdag
20th-century Swedish women politicians
20th-century Swedish politicians
21st-century Swedish women politicians
Women mayors of places in Sweden